Acanthurus is a genus of fish in the family Acanthuridae found in the Atlantic, Indian and Pacific Ocean. They are found in tropical oceans, especially near coral reefs, with most species in the Indo-Pacific but a few are found in the Atlantic Ocean. As other members of the family, they have a pair of spines, one on either side of the base of the tail which are dangerously sharp.

Species
There are currently 41 recognized species in this genus:
 Acanthurus achilles G. Shaw, 1803 (Achilles surgeonfish)
 Acanthurus albimento K. E. Carpenter, J. T. Williams & M. D. Santos, 2017 (White-chin surgeonfish)
 Acanthurus albipectoralis G. R. Allen & Ayling, 1987 (White-fin surgeonfish)
 Acanthurus auranticavus J. E. Randall, 1956 (Orange-socket surgeonfish)
 Acanthurus bahianus Castelnau, 1855 (Barber surgeonfish)
 Acanthurus bariene Lesson, 1831 (Black-spot surgeonfish)
 Acanthurus blochii Valenciennes, 1835 (Ring-tail surgeonfish)
 Acanthurus chirurgus (Bloch, 1787) (Doctorfish tang)
 Acanthurus chronixis J. E. Randall, 1960 (Chronixis surgeonfish)
 Acanthurus coeruleus Bloch & J. G. Schneider, 1801 (Atlantic blue tang)
 Acanthurus dussumieri Valenciennes, 1835 (Eye-stripe surgeonfish)
 Acanthurus fowleri de Beaufort, 1951 (Fowler's surgeonfish)
 Acanthurus gahhm (Forsskål, 1775) (Black surgeonfish)
 Acanthurus grammoptilus J. Richardson, 1843 (Fine-lined surgeonfish)
 Acanthurus guttatus J. R. Forster, 1801 (White-spotted surgeonfish)
 Acanthurus japonicus (P. J. Schmidt, 1931) (Japan surgeonfish)
 Acanthurus leucocheilus Herre, 1927 (Pale-lipped surgeonfish)
 Acanthurus leucopareius (O. P. Jenkins, 1903) (White-bar surgeonfish)
 Acanthurus leucosternon E. T. Bennett, 1833 (Powder-blue surgeonfish)
 Acanthurus lineatus (Linnaeus, 1758) (Lined surgeonfish)
 Acanthurus maculiceps (C. G. E. Ahl, 1923) (White-freckled surgeonfish)
 Acanthurus mata (G. Cuvier, 1829) (Elongate surgeonfish)
 Acanthurus monroviae Steindachner, 1876 (Monrovia surgeonfish)
 Acanthurus nigricans (Linnaeus, 1758) (White-cheek surgeonfish)
 Acanthurus nigricauda Duncker & Mohr (de), 1929 (Epaulette surgeonfish)
 Acanthurus nigrofuscus (Forsskål, 1775) (Brown surgeonfish)
 Acanthurus nigroris Valenciennes, 1835 (Blue-lined surgeonfish)
 Acanthurus nigros Günther, 1861 (Grey-head surgeonfish)
 Acanthurus nubilus (Fowler & B. A. Bean, 1929) (Pin-striped surgeonfish)
 Acanthurus olivaceus Bloch & J. G. Schneider, 1801 (Orange-spot surgeonfish)
 Acanthurus polyzona (Bleeker, 1868) (Black-barred surgeonfish)
 Acanthurus pyroferus Kittlitz, 1834 (Chocolate surgeonfish)
 Acanthurus randalli J. C. Briggs & D. K. Caldwell, 1957
 Acanthurus reversus J. E. Randall & Earle, 1999
 Acanthurus sohal (Forsskål, 1775) (Sohal surgeonfish)
 Acanthurus tennentii Günther, 1861 (Double-band surgeonfish)
 Acanthurus thompsoni (Fowler, 1923) (Thompson's surgeonfish)
 Acanthurus tractus F. Poey, 1860 (Ocean surgeonfish)
 Acanthurus triostegus (Linnaeus, 1758) (Convict surgeonfish)
 Acanthurus tristis J. E. Randall, 1993 (Indian Ocean mimic surgeonfish)
 Acanthurus xanthopterus Valenciennes, 1835 (Yellow-fin surgeonfish)

References

 
Acanthuridae
Marine fish genera
Taxa named by Peter Forsskål